Tiphaine Duquesne (born 22 August 1996) is a field hockey player from Belgium, who plays as a defender.

Career

Club hockey
In the Belgian Hockey League, Duquesne plays club hockey for the Waterloo Ducks.

National teams

Under–21
In 2014, Tiphaine Duquesne made her debut for the Belgium U–21 team at the EuroHockey Junior Championship in Waterloo.

She was a member of the junior national team for three years, including at the 2016 FIH Junior World Cup in Santiago where the team finished sixth. Her junior career culminated with a silver medal at the 2017 EuroHockey Junior Championship in Valencia.

Red Panthers
Duquesne made her debut for the Belgium 'Red Panthers' in 2014 during a test match against Argentina in Auderghem.

During the inaugural tournament of the FIH Pro League in 2019, Duquesne was a member of the Belgian side that finished in fifth place.

References

External links
 
 

1996 births
Living people
Female field hockey defenders
Waterloo Ducks H.C. players
Belgian female field hockey players